The Neuville is a historic apartment building located at 232 E. Walton Place in the Streeterville neighborhood of Chicago, Illinois. The eleven-story building was built in 1920, making it one of the first luxury apartment buildings in Streeterville. Architect John Reed Fugard of Fugard & Knapp, a firm which went on to design many of Streeterville's apartments, designed the Renaissance Revival building. As was typical of high-rises of the era, the lower two and upper two floors are the most ornate, with limestone facing on the lower two and projecting piers on the upper two; in contrast, the central floors are faced with plain red brick. An elaborate cornice runs along the roof on the front facade, while a plainer cornice above the second floor and a belt course above the ninth separate the building's sections. Like most luxury apartment buildings of the period, the building features a heavily ornamented entrance, a large lobby, and spacious ten-room apartments.

The building was added to the National Register of Historic Places on January 2, 2013.

References

Residential buildings on the National Register of Historic Places in Chicago
Apartment buildings in Chicago
Renaissance Revival architecture in Illinois
Residential buildings completed in 1920
1920 establishments in Illinois